The Bessemer Site, also known as the Talley Mounds and the Jonesboro Mounds, is  a South Appalachian Mississippian culture archaeological site located near the confluence of Halls Mill Creek and Valley Creek (a tributary of the Black Warrior River), west of downtown Bessemer in Jefferson County, Alabama. The  site was occupied in the early Mississippian period from about 1150 to 1250 CE.

See also
 Bottle Creek Mounds
 Moundville site
 Jere Shine site
 Taskigi Mound

References

External links
 Talley mounds
 Educational plaque located at the site

South Appalachian Mississippian culture
Archaeological sites in Alabama
Jefferson County, Alabama